In South Australia, Highway 1 is a  long route that follows the coastline of the state, from the Victorian border near Mount Gambier to the Western Australian border near Eucla. Highway 1 continues around the rest of Australia, joining all mainland state capitals, and connecting major centres in Tasmania. All roads within the Highway 1 system are allocated a road route numbered M1, A1, B1 or R1, depending on the state route numbering system. In South Australia, most of the highway is designated as route A1, with multi-lane, dual-carriage-way sections generally designated route M1, and the alignment around the Adelaide CBD designated route R1. South-east of Tailem Bend, it is designated route B1.

History

Highway 1 was created as part of the National Route Numbering system, adopted in 1955. The route was compiled from an existing network of state and local roads and tracks.

Route description
In South Australia, the highway connects:
 from the SA/VIC border
via  Princes Highway to
 Mount Gambier
via  Princes Highway to
 Tailem Bend
via  Princes Highway to
 Murray Bridge
via  South Eastern Freeway to
 Glen Osmond
via  Glen Osmond and Fullarton Roads to
 Dulwich, on the eastern edge of the Adelaide city centre
via  City Ring Route to
 Medindie, on the northern edge of North Adelaide
via  Main North Road to
 Gepps Cross
 via  Port Wakefield Road and Port Wakefield Highway to
 Port Wakefield
via  Augusta Highway to
 Port Augusta 
via  Eyre Highway to
 Eucla

Major intersections
  Riddoch Highway (A66/B66)
  Dukes Highway (A8)
  Portrush Road (A17)
  Salisbury Highway (A9)
  Northern Expressway (M2)
  Stuart Highway (A87)
  Lincoln Highway (B100)
  Tod Highway (B90)
  Flinders Highway (B100)

References

See also

 Highway 1 (New South Wales)
 Highway 1 (Northern Territory)
 Highway 1 (Queensland)
 Highway 1 (Tasmania)
 Highway 1 (Victoria)
 Highway 1 (Western Australia)

Highways in South Australia